Poliosia muricolor is a moth in the family Erebidae. It was described by Francis Walker in 1862. It is found on Borneo and in Singapore and India (Sikkim, Assam). The habitat consists of lowland forests.

Subspecies
Poliosia muricolor muricolor
Poliosia muricolor parva Moore, 1878 (Sikkim, Assam)

References

Moths described in 1862
Lithosiina